Quail-dove may refer to a bird in one of three genera in the pigeon and dove family Columbidae:

 Geotrygon
 Reinwardtoena
 Leptotrygon